Gerald Stith (born 1821) was the 18th mayor of New Orleans (June 21, 1858 – June 18, 1860).

External links
  Gerald Stith administration on New Orleans Public Library site

Mayors of New Orleans